Sidney (Sid) Ganis (born January 8, 1940) is an American motion picture executive and producer who has produced such films as Big Daddy, Deuce Bigalow: Male Gigolo, Mr. Deeds, The Master of Disguise and Akeelah and the Bee, Bang: The Bert Berns Story and Olympia.

On August 23, 2005, Ganis was elected President of the Academy of Motion Picture Arts and Sciences, serving a total of four consecutive one–year terms.

Prior to these roles, Ganis participated in a multitude of organizations including: serving on the board of directors at Marvel Entertainment for ten years until its sale to Disney in 2009, Center Theater Group from 1989 to 1995, Direct Sports Network (formerly DeskSite) as well as on the Boards of Film Independent, SF FILM, the Berkeley Art Museum/Pacific Film Archive (Bay Area), and various film festivals and film organizations around the country. He currently serves as vice president of The Academy of Motion Pictures Arts and Sciences.

Early life
Ganis was born in Brooklyn, New York. He is of Greek Jewish descent, from the city of Ioannina, in northwest Greece.

Career
Ganis was exposed to the world of entertainment when he worked as an office boy for theatrical publicists Lee Solters and Harvey Sabinson. This led him to a film career in marketing and publicity at several studios, including 20th Century Fox, Columbia Pictures, Seven Arts and Warner Bros. He eventually joined Lucasfilm, where he served as Senior Vice President for several years. There he was responsible for marketing The Empire Strikes Back, Return of the Jedi and the first two installments of the Indiana Jones tetralogy.

In 1986, Ganis joined Paramount Pictures and eventually would become president of the Motion Picture Group, where he helped launch Top Gun and Fatal Attraction. As president, he oversaw the development and production of the worldwide hit Ghost, and bought the underlying rights to Forrest Gump, which would go on to become one of Paramount's biggest hits—both financially and critically—of all time.

After leaving Paramount in 1990, Ganis became president of marketing and distribution at Columbia Pictures. He was eventually made vice chairman of the studio. In 1996, he stepped down to produce via his independent production company, Out of the Blue... Entertainment. Under this company, Ganis co-executive produced ABC's Pan Am (2011–12) along with his wife, Nancy Hult Ganis, a fellow film and TV producer who developed and executive produced the series.

Ganis has been working extensively in China with the Chinese government on various film projects. He is co-founder and Chairman of Jiaflix Enterprises, a US company with a long-term exclusive arrangement with the China Movie Channel and the website 1905, both under SAPPRFT (SARFT). He was an Honorary Chairman of Wuxi Studios, located near Shanghai. Notably, Jiaflix was an important part of the record-breaking success of Transformers: Age of Extinction in China for Paramount Pictures, surpassing the previous box office record of Avatar. Currently he is producing the feature film SHADOW SONG with partners at The H Collective Holdings in Los Angeles. Shadow Song is based on the short film A Children's Song which he produced in 2015.

References

External links
 
 Interview with Sid Ganis

1940 births
Film producers from New York (state)
Presidents of the Academy of Motion Picture Arts and Sciences
American film studio executives
Emmy Award winners
Living people
People from Brooklyn
American people of Greek-Jewish descent
Presidents of Paramount Pictures